The Church Of St Margaret (also known as St Margaret's Church), is the Anglican parish church of Great Barr and is located on Chapel Lane, Walsall, England. It is dedicated to Saint Margaret of Antioch.

The church was rebuilt in 1862, by Griffin. The tower was built of brick in 1677, but this is completely hidden by a Gothic revival red sandstone casing added in 1893. The spire is 18th-century. The  pulpit, in alabaster, was made to a design by Walter Tapper.

The church was granted Grade II listed status in July 1986, legally protecting it from unauthorised alteration or demolition. Its war memorial, described by Historic England as "a lantern cross in the medieval style", was separately listed, also at Grade II, in April 2016.

The church was historically in Staffordshire, and so its historic records are lodged with Staffordshire Record Office.

The church gives its name to the nearby St Margaret's Church of England Primary School, and to the former St Margaret's hospital in the adjacent grounds of Great Barr Hall.

References

Further reading

External links 

 

Grade II listed churches in the West Midlands (county)
Great Barr